Kappa is an Italian sportswear brand founded in Turin, Piedmont, Italy in 1978 by Marco Boglione, as a sportswear branch of the already existing "Robe di Kappa".

History

Maglificio Calzificio Torinese (MCT), a sock and underwear company from Turin, had a production problem with its Aquila brand in 1916. When the problem was fixed, all the new products were stamped with a K, standing for German Kontrolle. Sales surged and in 1967 the K line was formally called Kappa, the Greek letter for K.

Sponsorships

Olympic Committees
 Cuba
 Norway

Beach soccer

Club teams 

 Ecosistem Lamezia

Formula 1

Alpine F1 Team 
In January 2022, it was announced that Kappa would begin a multi-year partnership with the Alpine F1 Team, supplying the drivers and backroom team with apparel, and featuring their logo on the new car livery. Kappa is also seto develop new apparel collections for Alpine’s team kit, fan apparel, footwear and accessories, relying on a network of license to distribute these globally.

Football

Associations and leagues 
Kappa is the official football supplier for the following leagues, referees and associations:

  CBF (Brazilian Football Confederation)
  Serie B
  Football Queensland

Referees 
Kappa is the official football supplier for the following league referees:

  Brasileirão

National teams

Club teams

Africa 

  USM Alger
  Kaizer Chiefs
  Beni Suef
  Casa Sports
  Al-Hilal Omdurman
  ARP
  F.C. Platinum
  Espérance de Tunis

Asia 

  Adamstown Rosebud FC
  FC Bulleen Lions
  Green Gully SC
  South Melbourne FC
  Western United
  South West Queensland Thunder FC 
  Western Sydney Wanderers
  Wijaya FC
  Al-Diwaniya FC
  Khon Kaen United F.C.
  FK Köpetdag Aşgabat

Europe 

  Erzeni
  Cercle Brugge K.S.V.
  Charleroi   (Until 2022-2023 season)
  Seraing
  Chester 
  Dudley Town
  Gloucester City 
  Kidderminster Harriers F.C.
  Templer Way F.C.
  Angers  (Until 2022-2023 season)
 Caen  
 Laval
  Metz
   AS Monaco
 Niort
  Orléans
 Quevilly-Rouen
  Racing Besançon
  Red Star F.C.
  Stade Briochin
  Mainz 05   (Until 2022-2023 season)
  Mainz 05 II  (Until 2022-2023 season)
  Europa 
  Athens Kallithea 
  Panachaiki
  Panathinaikos  
  Bnei Yehuda
  Ironi Kiryat Shmona
  Bari
  Bitonto 
  Brescia 
  Cesena 
  Empoli
  Fiorentina
  Latte Dolce 
  Palermo
  Sanremese 
  Venezia
  ASWH
  Makedonija Gjorče Petrov
  Córdoba
  Extremadura
  Guadalajara  
  Cultural Leonesa
  Deportivo La Coruña
  Lugo
  Valladolid  (From the 2023-24 season)
  Jagiellonia Białystok
  Widzew Łódź  
  Estoril
  Pollok F.C. 
  Kırklarelispor
  Kocaelispor
  Nazilli Belediyespor 
  Turgutluspor
  Vanspor

North America 

  Deportivo Saprissa
  Real Estelí

Oceania 

  Club Penguin AFC
  Birkenhead United AFC
  Three Kings United
  Waiheke United AFC

South America 

  Aldosivi
  Huracán  (Until 2022 season)
  Racing Club
  Santamarina
  Tigre
  Unión de Santa Fe
  Vasco da Gama  (Until 2022 season)
  Guarani
  Unión Española
  Independiente Santa Fe
  Nacional  (From 2023 season)

Basketball

National teams 
  Slovakia
  British Basketball League all teams
  Ireland
  Singapore
  Venezuela

Club teams 

  Bouzalac
  Hermine Nantes
  MSB Le Mans
  Basket Lattes
  Auxilium Torino 
  Olimpo Basket Alba
  Anwil Włocławek
  Asseco Gdynia
  KK Metalac Valjevo
  Jeonju KCC Egis
  BC Brno

Baseball

Club teams 
  Lotte Giants

Boxing 
  Moruti Mthalane

Esports 

  Aegis
  AS Monaco Esports
  Audacity Esports
  Demise
  Deportivo Saprissa Esports
  FaZe Clan (FIFA)
  Kwangdong Freecs
  INFINITY
  Machete Gaming
  MAD Lions
  Movistar Riders
  Royal Never Give Up (Dota 2)
  Team Oplon
  Tundra Esports
  Vexed Gaming

Fencing

National teams 
  Federazione Italiana Scherma

Golf

National teams 
  Federazione Italiana Golf

Handball

National teams

Club teams 
   Ademar León
   BM Nava
   Espérance de Tunis

Ice hockey 

  HC Sparta Praha
  HC Energie Karlovy Vary
  Motor České Budějovice
  VHK Vsetín
  HC ZUBR Přerov
  HC RT Torax Poruba
  Draci Šumperk
  HC Baník Sokolov
  Hockey Milano Rossoblu

Field hockey

National teams 
  Malaysia

Rowing

National teams 
  Federazione Italiana Canottaggio|Italy

Rugby League 

On 28 May 2020 the 2021 Rugby League World Cup announced that Kappa had been selected as the official apparel sponsor of the tournament, which will include the brand supplying kit for all RLWC2021 match officials, volunteers and staff.

Club teams 
  Bradford Bulls
  Hunslet
  Salford Red Devils

Rugby Union

Club teams 

  Brive
 Castres Olympique
  Montpellier Hérault
  Aviron Bayonnais
  Rovigo
  Valladolid
  Barcelona Universitari
  Pontypridd

Volleyball

Club teams 
  Tampereen Isku-Volley
  Espérance de Tunis

Skiing

National teams 
  USA

Esports

Club teams 
  MAD Lions
  Royal Never Give Up
  Demise

See also 

 Nordica (company)
 Playlife
 Legea
 Tecnica
 Mudflap girl – other iconic reclining silhouette

References

External links 

 
 Article on Team Sassco's switch from Adidas to Kappa

Sportswear brands
Clothing brands of Italy
Athletic shoe brands
Shoe brands
Sporting goods manufacturers of Italy
Shoe companies of Italy
Clothing companies established in 1916
Italian companies established in 1916
Manufacturing companies based in Turin
1980s fashion
1990s fashion
2000s fashion
2010s fashion
2020s fashion